Gordon Reuben Alexander (1885 – 24 April 1917) was a British fencer. He competed in the individual foil and épée events at the 1912 Summer Olympics. He was killed in action during World War I.

Death
While attacking the town of Villers-Plouich, a fellow soldier was wounded by a German artillery shell, and Alexander rushed to help him. While Alexander was dressing the soldier's wound, he was killed by another shell.

Fencing career
In 1912, he competed in the individual foil and épée events at the 1912 Summer Olympics. the following year in 1913, he won the foil title at the British Fencing Championships.

See also
 List of Olympians killed in World War I

References

External links
 

1885 births
1917 deaths
British military personnel killed in World War I
British male fencers
Olympic fencers of Great Britain
Fencers at the 1912 Summer Olympics
Sportspeople from Kensington